Oceans of Fun is a tropically-themed water park that opened on May 31, 1982, in Kansas City, Missouri, to celebrate the tenth anniversary of the adjacent Worlds of Fun amusement park. When it opened, it was the largest water park in the world. It is owned and operated by Cedar Fair.

History

On August 31, 2012, Oceans of Fun announced the largest-ever expansion in 2013. It was also announced that Worlds of Fun will no longer be separately gated and be combined with Oceans of Fun. The water park will be completely renovated, and construction began in 2012. In 2015, Oceans of Fun added swan boats to Buccaneer Bay and Splash Island. In 2019, the park announced that Diamond Head would be closed at the end of the season. The removal of the slide will make way for Riptide Raceway, a mat racing slide. On November 6, 2019, it was announced that Riptide Raceway will be the world's longest slide of its kind coming in at 486 feet long.

Slides and attractions

Incidents

Trey Wallace

On August 24, 2019, a pair of guests in the eight foot section of the one million gallon wave pool summoned lifeguards to enter the water to retrieve the submerged victim, 14-year-old Trey Wallace, who had been under water for sixteen minutes. Though EMTs were able to regain a pulse, Trey Wallace was declared brain dead a week later after his 15th birthday.  His organs were donated.  In the wrongful death lawsuit which followed, the park settled with the Wallace Family for an unspecified sum.  No member of the Aquatics Leadership Team was held accountable for their actions that day.

Adeline Stewart

On July 5th, 2022, CPR was performed after extrication on a girl, 6-year-old Adeline Stewart, pulled from Coconut Cove at Oceans of Fun.  One eyewitness reported foam coming from her mouth and nose during CPR.  The Coconut Cove section of the park was shut down after the incident.  On July 12th, 2022, media reports indicated that the, "guest in distress," had died from her injuries.  A "guest in distress," a term used by Ellis and Associates, the lifeguard certification system in use at Oceans of Fun, for any individual that has been brought out of the water by a lifeguard, in preference to a, "victim," or, "a drowning victim."

References

External links
 Oceans of Fun!

Cedar Fair water parks
Water parks in Missouri
Tourist attractions in Kansas City, Missouri
Buildings and structures in Kansas City, Missouri
Worlds of Fun
1982 establishments in Missouri
Amusement parks opened in 1982